Mitchell David Wagstaff (born 2 September 2003) is an English cricketer. He made his List A debut on 30 July 2021, for Derbyshire in the 2021 Royal London One-Day Cup.

Wagstaff attended Trent College.

References

External links
 

2003 births
Living people
English cricketers
Derbyshire cricketers
Place of birth missing (living people)
Cricketers from Derby
People educated at Trent College